Victoria Theatre is a 480-seat theater in San Francisco's Mission District, which presents locally produced original plays, live concerts, film festivals, musicals, performances by international performing companies and other kinds of events. The theater is located at 2961 16th Street (at Capp Street) in San Francisco, California. It is not connected to the Red Vic, a now-closed repertory movie theater in the Haight.

History
The Victoria Theatre was originally built in 1908 as Brown's Opera House, showing vaudeville and motion pictures, and was owned by ancestors of the California politicians Pat Brown and Jerry Brown. In the 1940s and 1950s, the theater was named El Teatro Victoria and showed Spanish language movies.  From 1963 to 1978, the theater was a burlesque house called the New Follies Burlesk. After renovation in 1978 and reopening in March 1979, it was renamed the Victoria Theatre, and is the oldest operational theatre in San Francisco.

In 1984, Whoopi Goldberg "first came to national prominence with her one-woman show" in which she portrayed Mabley, Moms, first performed in Berkeley, California, and then at the Victoria Theatre. The Oakland Museum of California preserves a poster advertising the show.

Recent activity
The theatre has video and 35mm with Dolby Pro Logic Surround Sound capabilities. 
The Victoria Theatre became San Francisco Landmark #215 on 2 March 1996. The 2010 film All About Evil by Peaches Christ (stage name for Joshua Grannell), was filmed in and outside the Victoria Theatre.

From June 19 to 29, 2014, the Victoria, along with the Roxie Cinema and the Castro Theatre, hosted the 38th Frameline San Francisco International LGBT Film Festival.  The theater often hosts new documentary films like The Recess Ends, and live theatrical performances by Ray of Light Theatre such as Bat Boy: The Musical (2005), The Rocky Horror Show (2008), and The Who's Tommy (2009).

See also
List of San Francisco Designated Landmarks
Castro Theatre
Roxie Cinema

References

External links 

 Official Site

Theatres in San Francisco
Cinemas and movie theaters in the San Francisco Bay Area
Mission District, San Francisco
San Francisco Designated Landmarks
Event venues established in 1908
Theatres completed in 1908
1908 establishments in California